The Persian-language magazine Nowruz (DMG: Naurūz; English: "New day" or "New Year") was published in Tehran between 1903 and 1904. A total of 48 issues was edited weekly in a single volume.
In terms of content, the journal focused particularly on scientific articles and on education and job training in Iran.

References

External links
 Online-Version: Naurūz

1903 establishments in Iran
1904 disestablishments in Iran
Defunct magazines published in Iran
Magazines established in 1903
Magazines disestablished in 1904
Magazines published in Tehran
Persian-language magazines
Qajar Iran